Kossoff is a Russian surname, also used by Russian Jews. It is derived from Russian word "kos" meaning bluebird. Variants of the name are Kossov, Kosov, Kossow. Notable people with the surname include:

 David Kossoff, British actor, father of Paul Kossoff
 Leon Kossoff, British expressionist painter
 Paul Kossoff, British rock guitarist